Darxide (stylized as DarXide) is a shoot 'em up for the 32X by Frontier Developments, released in January 1996 only in Europe.  Designed by David Braben, it was one of the last releases for the console. Gameplay is similar to that of Asteroids in three dimensions. Players must destroy a number of space rocks in order to complete each level.

Reception of Darxide was mixed. The game was followed in 2004 by Darxide EMP, an expanded version released for Pocket PCs and Nokia mobile phones.

Gameplay and development 
Darxide is a shoot 'em up game.  Players control a space fighter, with a set of instrument panels as a head-up display.  There are 11 levels in the game.  The premise of the game involves a series of asteroids being mined, with defenses protecting them.  The object of the game is to eliminate the defenses and destroy the asteroids.  Innocent miners, released off the asteroids, also have to be rescued.  The game's plot involves an alien race which wants the mining operations for themselves, and have hidden forces inside some hollowed-out asteroids.  Destroying those asteroids releases the enemy forces.  Players have an auto-targeting weapon, as well as power-ups available later in the game.  Levels are timed by the approach of a blue moon; failure to complete the level on time results in loss of a life.

Elements of the game were influenced by designer David Braben, who had previously worked on Frontier: Elite II.  Unlike Elite II, the gameplay was designed to be simpler with more focused objectives. The development team expressed the desire to include a voiced computer in-game, similar to those in science fiction movies. Development of the game was covered by Russian magazine Sega Pro.

Reception and legacy 

Reception to Darxide was mixed. Gus, one of the reviewers for Mean Machines Sega, stated that the gameplay improves and becomes more interesting later into the game, calling the game an homage to Asteroids. Also writing for Mean Machines, reviewer Marcus called the game "a strangely 'empty' experience that fails to excite."  Video Games, a German magazine, praised the game's graphics and solid gameplay, but criticized the sound as being of a quality expected for a Mega Drive game.  By contrast, German magazine Mega Fun praised the sound and quality of the graphics, but criticized the gameplay for being monotonous and lacking variety.

Darxide was one of the last games to be released for the 32X, and was only released in Europe. It was followed by a port, Darxide EMP, in 2003 for Pocket PC and Nokia S60 mobile phones. Retro Gamers Mike Bevan commented that Darxide looks impressive given the hardware, though it was made more difficult by the lack of a crosshair on screen. Scott Reed, also of Retro Gamer, commented that the game is "alright", but called the game a collector's item and stated "there's no need to pay nearly a grand for it, either."

See also
Shadow Squadron

References

External links

 

1996 video games
Europe-exclusive video games
Sega 32X games
Shoot 'em ups
Video games scored by Richard Jacques
Video games developed in the United Kingdom
Sega 32X-only games